Nikola Lazić is a politician in Serbia. He served in the National Assembly of Serbia from 2020 to 2022 as a member of the Serbian Progressive Party. Twenty-one years old at the time of his inauguration, he is currently the youngest member of the Serbian parliament.

Private career
Lazić lives in Belgrade. He was recognized as a physiotherapeutic technician after graduating from a specialized high school program and is a student at the Faculty of Media and Communications at Megatrend University. His mother, Verica Lazić, has been an advisor to Serbian president Aleksandar Vučić on social and health issues since 2017.

Politician
Lazić received the 160th position on the Progressive Party's Aleksandar Vučić — For Our Children electoral list in the 2020 Serbian parliamentary election and was elected when the list won a landslide majority with 188 out of 250 mandates. He is now a member of the assembly committee on the rights of the child; a deputy member of the committee on education, science, technological development, and the information society; a deputy member of the committee on administrative, budgetary, mandate, and immunity issues; a member of the subcommittee on youth and sports; the leader of Serbia's parliamentary friendship group with Uganda; and a member of the parliamentary friendship groups with Cuba, Cyprus, France, Greece, Italy, Japan, Montenegro, Spain, and Turkey.

References

1999 births
Living people
Politicians from Belgrade
Members of the National Assembly (Serbia)
Serbian Progressive Party politicians